Canadian Forces Base Gander (also CFB Gander), is a Canadian Forces base located in Gander, Newfoundland and Labrador. It is operated as an air force base by the Royal Canadian Air Force and is home to search and rescue operations that cover a vast swath of the western North Atlantic and southern Arctic and a Canadian Coastal Radar station amongst other things. It is home to 9 Wing Gander.

CFB Gander is co-located at Gander International Airport.

RCAF Station Gander
The Newfoundland Airport was established by the Dominion of Newfoundland in 1936 and it became a strategically important airfield for piston-engined aircraft in the late 1930s.

Shortly after World War II was declared, the Government of Newfoundland turned the operation of the airfield over to the Royal Canadian Air Force (RCAF) in 1940, which had been tasked by the United Kingdom the responsibility to provide aerial defence for the dominion. The No. 10 Bomber and Reconnaissance (BR) Squadron began operating from the airfield, flying Douglas Digbys and later, Liberators with responsibility to protect supply convoys in the North Atlantic from enemy U-boats.

The airfield was renamed RCAF Station Gander in 1941 and it became heavily used by Ferry Command for transporting military aircraft from Canada and the United States to the European theatre. By 1943, Gander was the largest RCAF station in the world (in terms of physical size) and the Canadian Army maintained a strong presence at the airfield, providing anti-aircraft and airfield defence.

Several units were based at RCAF Station Gander during the war. No. 10 Squadron remained until August 1945 and was reinforced at times by No. 5 Squadron and No. 116 Squadron flying Cansos for anti-submarine patrols and search and rescue. From 1942 Hurricane fighters of the Royal Air Force No. 126 Squadron, No. 127 Squadron, and No. 129 Squadron were based at RCAF Station Gander. Throughout the war the Royal Canadian Navy (RCN) maintained a communications station at RCAF Station Gander, Its main task was high-frequency direction finding (HFDF) and communications monitoring of German U-boat radio transmissions.

The United States Army Air Forces Antisubmarine Command assigned several squadrons of long-range antisubmarine aircraft (B-24 Liberator, B-18 Bolo) to fly killer-hunter flights over the Grand Banks and also provide convoy escort overflights from Newfoundland. After the fall of 1943, these missions were undertaken by the United States Navy.

The RCAF handed operation of the airfield back to the Government of Newfoundland in March 1946 and removed its presence at what was promptly renamed Gander Airport (it was later upgraded to international status), although the RCN's radio monitoring station remained in operation. The airfield was taken over by Canada's federal government under the Department of Transport in 1949 after Newfoundland became Canada's tenth province. Facilities and runways were enlarged and modified for larger aircraft.

When Newfoundland joined Confederation, the RCN formally acquired the property known as the "Old Navy Site" and Naval Radio station Gander, call sign CGV, was born. Naval Radio Station (NRS) Gander consisted of four buildings, four sailors and a few civilian personnel.

Aerodrome
The field was listed as "All hard surfaced" and had four runways listed as follows:

Pinetree Line Radar site
In 1952, the United States Air Force constructed a General Surveillance radar station near the airfield as part of the Pinetree Line, designated "N-25". The new station was reassigned in 1953 to the Royal Canadian Air Force and took up the retired name RCAF Station Gander (designated "C-25"). The station functioned as a Ground-Control Intercept (GCI) and warning station housing the 226 Aircraft Control and Warning Squadron. As a GCI station, the squadron's role was to guide interceptor aircraft toward unidentified intruders picked up on the unit's radar scopes.

It was equipped with the following radars:
 Search Radar: AN/FPS-3C, AN/FPS-20A, AN/FPS-93A, AN/FPS-117
 Height Radar: AN/TPS-502, AN/FPS-6B, AN/FPS-26

On 1 July 1990, the site was inactivated and closed.

Canadian Forces Station Gander
On February 1, 1968, the RCN, RCAF and Canadian Army were unified and reorganized into the Canadian Forces. RCAF Station Gander, operating the Pinetree Line radar station and the Naval Radio Station Gander, was renamed Canadian Forces Station Gander, or CFS Gander.

In 1970 a new expanded communications monitoring facility was constructed for Communications Command, replacing Naval Radio Station Gander in 1971. CFS Gander's Pinetree Line radar and its new communications facilities provided support to NORAD fighter-interceptors operating from CFB Chatham and CFB Bagotville with the CF-101 Voodoo.

In 1977, Gander saw its first military flying unit return to the area since the war when a detachment of 424 Squadron, flying CH-113 Labrador helicopters moved to CFS Gander to provide search and rescue (SAR) operations (this being in response to Canada declaring its  Exclusive Economic Zone offshore, resulting in increased Canadian fishing activities). Having found a permanent home at Gander, the SAR helicopters were no longer a 424 Squadron detachment and a new unit identifier was required. Thus, in May 1977, 103 Search and Rescue Flight was reactivated at Gander. Air Command (AIRCOM) also regained control of CFS Gander from Communications Command in May 1977, although Communications Command continued to operate the radio intercept facility. 103 Squadron was housed in a separate facility constructed some distance from the civilian airfield terminal.

Canadian Forces Base Gander

By 1984 CFS Gander was the largest Canadian Forces Station in the Canadian Forces. Because Gander was such a large establishment and because 103 Rescue Unit had such a high-profile with its ocean rescue mission, the station was officially upgraded to a Canadian Forces Base, becoming Canadian Forces Base Gander or CFB Gander in March 1984.

During the early 1990s the federal government began to cut back on its defence budget, resulting in numerous base closures across Canada. AIRCOM units were consolidated into wings in April 1993, which became the high-level "lodger unit" at Canadian Forces Bases which operated as air force bases. Thus while the actual base is known as CFB Gander, its primary lodger unit (or operational unit) is 9 Wing, frequently referred to as 9 Wing Gander.

Among its many roles, 9 Wing Gander is responsible for providing search and rescue services throughout Newfoundland and Labrador, northeastern Quebec, the eastern Arctic and offshore waters of these regions. Crews of 103 Search and Rescue Squadron are on 24-hour standby, ready to answer the call in one of the busiest search and rescue regions in Canada.

103 Squadron also offers transient aircraft servicing to visiting Canadian Forces and allied aircraft as requested.

9 Wing includes the 9 Air Reserve Augmentation Flight. It augments and support the operations, administrative and technical functions of the base. Its Airfield Engineers Flight provides trained engineer reservists from various trades to support UN and Canadian Forces deployments worldwide.

CFB Gander is also host to the Leitrim Detachment which operates and maintains signals intelligence and utilizes a Wullenweber AN/FRD-10 circularly disposed antenna array for High-frequency direction finding of high-priority targets. 9 Wing Telecommunications provides all military air units at Gander with message transmission and reception services.

In addition, CFB Gander operates and maintains a Canadian Coastal Radar on behalf of Fighter Group Canadian NORAD Region Headquarters.  Also based at CFB Gander is the Headquarters of 5 Canadian Rangers Patrol Group which is part of the Army's 5th Canadian Division.

Units

Current units
103 Search and Rescue squadron
9 Wing air reserve flight
5 Canadian Ranger Patrol Group
29 Military Police flight

Former units

Royal Canadian Air Force
 226 Aircraft Control and Warning Squadron
 770 Communications Research Squadron
No. 5 Squadron
No. 10 Squadron
No. 116 Squadron

Former United States Air Force 
24th Tactical Missile Squadron
6th Tactical Missile Squadron
19th Antisubmarine Squadron 
6th Antisubmarine Squadron 
4th Antisubmarine Squadron

See also
Gander International Airport 
Stewart Air National Guard Base, a U.S. base that also shares its runways with a civilian airport

References

External links
9 Wing Gander

Canadian Forces bases in Newfoundland and Labrador
Military airbases in Newfoundland and Labrador
Canadian Forces Supplementary Radio System
World War II airfields in Canada
Military installations in Newfoundland and Labrador